Dazkırı is a town of Afyonkarahisar Province in the Aegean region of Turkey, 140 km from the city of Afyon on the road to Denizli. It is the seat of Dazkırı District. Its population is 5,640 (2021). The climate in the district is hot and dry in summer, and cold and wet in winter. The mayor is İsmail Taylan (CHP).

Economy
Dazkırı and Başmakçı are 10 km away from each other and livestock business is significantly important income for the region. It is estimated that there are approximately 500 family-run chicken farms and business companies in the area. Turba tavukculuk is one of the leading family business companies.

Dazkırı is also known for its hand-woven carpets.

Notable natives
 Aykut Oray, film actor

References

External links

Populated places in Afyonkarahisar Province
Towns in Turkey
Dazkırı District